The governor of South Australia is the representative in South Australia of the monarch of Australia, currently King Charles III. The governor performs the same constitutional and ceremonial functions at the state level as does the governor-general of Australia at the national level. In accordance with the conventions of the Westminster system of parliamentary government, the governor nearly always acts solely on the advice of the head of the elected government, the premier of South Australia. Nevertheless, the governor retains the reserve powers of the Crown, and has the right to dismiss the premier. As from June 2014, Queen Elizabeth II, upon the recommendation of the premier, accorded all current, future and living former governors the title 'The Honourable' for life. The first six governors oversaw the colony from proclamation in 1836, until self-government and an elected Parliament of South Australia was granted in the year prior to the inaugural 1857 election.

The first Australian-born governor of South Australia was Major-General Sir James Harrison (appointed 1968), and most subsequent governors have been Australian-born. The first South Australian-born governor was Sir Mark Oliphant (appointed 1971), and the first Aboriginal governor was Sir Douglas Nicholls (appointed 1976). 

The current governor is diplomat Frances Adamson who was sworn in at Government House, Adelaide on 7 October 2021, replacing Hieu Van Le, who held the role from 2014 to 2021. 

The governor's official residence is Government House, in Adelaide, the state's capital.

Role 
Prior to self-government, the governor was responsible to the Government of the United Kingdom and was charged with implementing laws and policy. Currently, the governor is responsible for safeguarding the South Australian Constitution and facilitating the work of the Parliament and state government.

The governor exercises power on the advice of ministers, conveyed through the Executive Council. Constitutional powers bestowed upon the governor and used with the consent and advice of the Executive Council include:

 to appoint and dismiss ministers.
 exercising the prerogative of mercy.
 issuing regulations and proclamations under existing laws.
 giving royal assent to bills passed by Parliament.
 appointing judges, royal commissioners and senior public servants.
 dissolving Parliament and issuing writs for elections.

The governor additionally maintains 'reserve powers' which can be used without the consent of the Executive Council. These powers relate to the appointment and dismissal of ministers and Parliament.

Governor's standard
The governor standard of South Australia is the same design as the British blue ensign with the Union Flag at the upper left quarter. On the right side, the State Badge of South Australia, comprising a  piping shrike in a golden disc, is surmounted by the St. Edward's crown.
 
If the standard is flying at Government House, on a vehicle or at an event, this indicates that the governor is present.
 
Past and present standards of the governor

Governor's awards and commendations

Awards
The governor of South Australia supports outstanding achievers within the South Australian community through the presentation of a number of annual awards:
The Governor's Multicultural Awards recognise and celebrate South Australians who promote multiculturalism and increase the understanding of the benefits of cultural diversity in our community; administered by the Department of the premier and Cabinet through Multicultural Affairs. They are presented by the governor on the advice of an independent judging panel.
The Governor's Aboriginal Youth Awards recognise young Aboriginal South Australians, aged between 15 and 29 years, who are showing potential and determination to achieve success, or who are excelling in their chosen field in one of three areas: Sport, Arts and Higher Education; delivered through a partnership between the Department of the Premier and Cabinet’s Aboriginal Affairs and Reconciliation division and the Office of the Governor.
The Governor’s Civics Awards for Schools provide the opportunity for young South Australians to develop their understanding of the role citizenship plays in a multicultural and democratic society. The inaugural awards in 2019 had two categories: an individual and a group award for Year 5 students; in 2020, they expanded to include students from Years 5–12.

Commendations
The governor also awards a series of commendations for excellence in the SACE year 12 exams, including:
Governor of South Australia Commendation – Excellence Award
Governor of South Australia Commendation – Aboriginal Student SACE Excellence Award
Governor of South Australia Commendation – Excellence in Modified SACE Award.

List of governors of South Australia

Administrators and lieutenant-governors
These people administered the government in the absence of the official governor.

External links

 The Official Website of the Governor of South Australia
 Previous governors on official website

References

 
South Australia
Parliament of South Australia
South Australia-related lists
1836 establishments in Australia